The 2011 Runnymede Borough Council election took place in May 2011 to fill 14 open seats on the Runnymede Borough District Council. The Conservative Party swept the elections, earning nearly 86% of the seats with only 53% of votes cast.

Election result

Ward results

References

2011 English local elections
2011
2010s in Surrey